Lutwyche Cemetery is a cemetery located at Kedron, Brisbane, Queensland, Australia. It opened in 1878 and saw its first burial in the same year. It is located at the corner of Gympie and Kitchener Roads, approximately ten kilometres north of Brisbane.

Notable people interred

 Charles Moffatt Jenkinson (1865–1954), Member of the Queensland Legislative Assembly and mayor of Brisbane
 Lionel Lukin (1868–1944), Supreme Court of Queensland judge
 Patrick Short (1859–1941), the first Queensland-born police commissioner (1921–1925) 
 Billy Sing (1886–1943), World War I sniper
  John Andrew Stuart (1940–1979), who along with James Richard Finch was responsible for the 1973 Whiskey Au Go Go fire that killed 15 people
 George Witton (1874–1942), court martialed along with Breaker Morant and Peter Handcock for the killing of Boer prisoners
 Buddy Williams (1918–1986), Australian country music pioneer

War graves

The cemetery contains war graves of nine Commonwealth service personnel of World War I and 389 of World War II, besides three servicemen of other nationalities.  Within the cemetery's war graves plot stands the Queensland Cremation Memorial, erected by the Commonwealth War Graves Commission, recording 36 Australian service personnel who died in Queensland during World War II and were cremated at Mount Thompson Crematorium.

Within the cemetery is a Cross of Sacrifice commemorating those who served in World War I and World War II, which was erected and paid for by the Imperial War Graves Commission. The stone used is Freestone (Helidon) and it was completed in 1950.

Gallery

References

External links
 Lutwyche Cemetery Brisbane, Queensland, Australia (www.interment.net)
 The Lutwyche Cemetery Project (partial transcription)

Cemeteries in Brisbane
Geography of Brisbane
Queensland in World War II
1878 establishments in Australia
Cemeteries established in the 1870s